Bhavesh Bhatt (Gujarati: ભાવેશ ભટ્ટ) is a Gujarati language ghazal poet from Gujarat, India. His works include Chhe To Chhe (2009) and Bhitarno Shankhanaad (2014). He won the Shayda Award of 2014 for his contribution in Gujarati ghazal poetry.

Early life 
Bhavesh Bhatt was born on 12 January 1975 in Ahmedabad, Gujarat to Dilipbhai and Jayabahen. He completed his primary education (standard 1 to 5) from Ankur Highschool, Ahmedabad in 1985 and secondary education (standard 6 to 9) from H. B. Kapadia Highschool located at Delhi Darwaza, Ahmedabad in 1989. He completed his Standard 10 from B. V. High school, Ahmedabad in 1990 and Standard 12 from Ashish Highschool, Ahmedabad in 1992. In 1994, he joined Bachelor of Arts at Gujarat College and dropped out after the first year. Bhavesh married Bijal in 2007 and they have a daughter.

Career 
He started writing at the age of 25. His first publication was a ghazal, published in the Gujarati poetry journal, Kavilok in 2003. Subsequently, his ghazals are published in several Gujarati literary magazines including Gazalvishwa, Shabdasrishti, Dhabak, Tadarthya, Shabdasar, Navneet Samarpan and Kavita. In 2007, his ghazals have been anthologized in Vis Pancha, a collection of Gujarati ghazals, with other four young poets including Anil Chavda, Ashok Chavda, Hardwar Goswami and Chandresh Makwana. He also writes ghazal in Urdu language.

Works 
Chhe To Chhe, his first poetry collection, was published in 2009, followed by Bhitarno Shankhanaad in 2014, which gained him critical acclaim. He is a forerunner of modernity in the Gujarati ghazal and emphasized on the need to derive innovative works from language. His ghazals mainly revolve around subjects like love, social paradoxes, contemporary life and God.

Awards
He received Shayda Award in 2014. He also received Ravji Patel Award in 2014 instituted by Gujarat Samachar and Samanvay; Yuva Puraskar (2014) instituted by Bharatiya Bhasha Parishad, Kolkata.

See also
 List of Gujarati-language writers

References 

1975 births
Living people
21st-century Indian poets
Gujarati-language writers
Indian male poets
Gujarati-language poets
People from Ahmedabad district
Poets from Gujarat
21st-century Indian male writers